Kameron Pearce-Paul (born 28 February 1997) is a former English professional rugby league footballer who played as a  or er for the London Broncos and London Skolars in Betfred League 1.

Background
He is the older brother of Kai Pearce-Paul who plays for Wigan Warriors and Kaden Pearce-Paul who plays for Saracens academy.

Playing career
Pearce-Paul has previously spent time on loan at the Hemel Stags and Oldham RLFC (Heritage № 1376) in Kingstone Press League 1.

References

External links

London Broncos profile

1997 births
Living people
Coventry Bears players
English rugby league players
Hemel Stags players
London Broncos players
London Skolars players
Oldham R.L.F.C. players
Rugby league players from Greater London
Rugby league wingers